Latvia, at the 2006 European Athletics Championships held in Sweden. In this European Championship will start 16 athletes who will represent Latvia.

Results

Competitors

Nations at the 2006 European Athletics Championships
Latvia at the European Athletics Championships
European Athletics Championships